Luke and the Rural Roughnecks is a 1916 American short comedy film starring Harold Lloyd.

Cast
 Harold Lloyd - Lonesome Luke
 Snub Pollard
 Earl Mohan
 Bebe Daniels

See also
 Harold Lloyd filmography

References

External links

1916 films
1916 short films
American silent short films
1916 comedy films
American black-and-white films
Films directed by Hal Roach
Silent American comedy films
Lonesome Luke films
American comedy short films
1910s American films